The levator anguli oris (caninus) is a facial muscle of the mouth arising from the canine fossa, immediately below the infraorbital foramen. It elevates angle of mouth medially. Its fibers are inserted into the angle of the mouth, intermingling with those of the zygomaticus, triangularis, and orbicularis oris. Specifically, the levator anguli oris is innervated by the buccal branches of the facial nerve.

Additional images

References

External links
 PTCentral

Muscles of the head and neck